Ezequiel Bosio (born April 12, 1985 in Santa Fe) is an Argentine racing driver. He has run in different series, with major success in Formula Renault Argentina and TC 2000.

Career 
2003: Argentine Formula Renault Runner Up
2004: Argentine Formula Renault Champion
2007: TC2000 (Honda Civic) won the 200 km de Buenos Aires
2008: Turismo Carretera
2009: TC2000 (Honda Civic)

External links 

1985 births
Living people
Sportspeople from Santa Fe, Argentina
Argentine racing drivers
French Formula Renault 2.0 drivers
Formula Renault Argentina drivers
TC 2000 Championship drivers
Turismo Carretera drivers
Top Race V6 drivers
Stock Car Brasil drivers

Tech 1 Racing drivers